Moir or MOIR may refer to:

 Moir (surname), a surname of Scottish origin, and is part of the Clan Gordon of the Scottish Highlands
 Moir Tod Stormonth Darling, Lord Stormonth-Darling (1844–1912), Scottish politician and judge
 Moir Lockhead (born 1945), English businessman
 Moir Leslie, a character in the BBC radio sitcom Flying the Flag
 Revolutionary Independent Labour Movement (Movimiento Obrero Independiente y Revolucionario or MOIR), a left-wing party in Colombia
 Moir baronets, two titles, one in the Baronetage of Nova Scotia and one in the Baronetage of the United Kingdom
 Moir Gardens, botanical gardens in Hawaii

See also 
 Moire (disambiguation)